The Serenity Prayer is a prayer attributed to the American theologian Reinhold Niebuhr (1892–1971) in 1943.  However, Winnifred Crane Wygal wrote an early version in the Santa Cruz Sentinel of March 15, 1933, as noted in the above cited research by Fred Shapiro, discussing Wygal's diary entry for October 31, 1932. The diary referenced intellectual work by Niebuhr that used the phrases "the serenity to accept" and "the courage to change," but not in the context of a prayer. This suggests that the first published prayerful use may have been the 1933 work of Wygal.
 It is commonly quoted as:
God, grant me the serenity to accept the things I cannot change, 
courage to change the things I can, 
and wisdom to know the difference.

The prayer originally asked for courage first, and specifically for changing things that must be changed, not things that simply can be changed:
Father, give us courage to change what must be altered, serenity to accept what cannot be helped, and the insight to know the one from the other.

The prayer was composed in 1933. The prayer spread rapidly, often without attribution, through church groups in the 1930s and 1940s and was adopted and popularized by Alcoholics Anonymous in 1941 and other twelve-step programs. Niebuhr used it in a 1943 sermon at Heath Evangelical Union Church in Heath, Massachusetts. It also appeared in a sermon of Niebuhr's in the 1944 Book of Prayers and Services for the Armed Forces, while Niebuhr first published it in 1951 in a magazine column.

Early versions of the prayer are given no title, but it was called the Serenity Prayer in a 1950 AA Grapevine journal of Alcoholics Anonymous.

In 1962, Hallmark began using the prayer in its graduation cards crediting Niebuhr; in the 1970s they also produced a wall plaque. Posters and household ornaments were produced by others without attribution.

Versions

The prayer has appeared in many versions. Reinhold Niebuhr's versions of the prayer were always printed as a single prose sentence; printings that set out the prayer as three lines of verse modify the author's original version. The most well-known form is a late version, as it includes a reference to grace not found before 1951:

God, give me grace to accept with serenity
the things that cannot be changed,
Courage to change the things
which should be changed,
and the Wisdom to distinguish
the one from the other.

The following clauses were added in the AA Origin of the Serenity Prayer: A Historic Paper but were not part of the tripartite original.  Niebuhr's daughter in her book The Serenity Prayer: Faith and Politics in Time of Peace and War said: "...their message and their tone are not in any way Niebuhrian."

Living one day at a time,
Enjoying one moment at a time,
Accepting hardship as a pathway to peace,
Taking, as He did,
This sinful world as it is,
Not as I would have it,
Trusting that He will make all things right,
If I surrender to His will,
That I may be reasonably happy in this life,
And supremely happy with Him forever in the next.

Amen.

A version (apparently quoted from memory) appeared in the "Queries and Answers" column in The New York Times Book Review, July 2, 1950, p. 23, asking for the author of the quotation. A reply in the same column in the issue for August 13, 1950, p. 19, attributed the prayer to Niebuhr, quoting it as follows:
O God and Heavenly Father,
Grant to us the serenity of mind to accept that which cannot be changed; courage to change that which can be changed, and wisdom to know the one from the other, through Jesus Christ our Lord, Amen.

Some twelve-step recovery programs use a slightly different version:
God grant me the serenity to accept the things I cannot change,
Courage to change the things I can,
and Wisdom to know the difference.

Early history

Several versions of the prayer then appeared in newspaper articles in the early 1930s written by, or reporting on talks given by, Wygal. In 1940, Wygal included the following form of the prayer in a book on worship, attributing it to Niebuhr: 
O God, give us the serenity to accept what cannot be changed, the courage to change what can be changed, and the wisdom to know the one from the other.

Wygal was a longtime YWCA official and all early recorded usages were from women involved in volunteer or educational activities connected to the YWCA.

The earliest printed reference, in 1936, mentions that during a speech, a Miss Mildred Pinkerton "quotes the prayer," as if to indicate it was already in a circulation known to the reporter, or that Pinkerton relayed it as a quote, without mentioning its authorship. A 1937 Christian student publication attributed the prayer to Niebuhr in the following form, which matches the other earliest published forms in requesting "courage to change" before petitioning for serenity:

Father, give us courage to change what must be altered, serenity to accept what cannot be helped, and the insight to know the one from the other.

Various other authors also cited Niebuhr as the source of the prayer from 1937 on. The Federal Council of Churches (NCC) included the prayer in a book for army chaplains and servicemen in 1944 and the USO circulated the prayer (with Niebuhr's permission) to soldiers on printed cards during World War II. In 1950, in response to questions about the already quite widely known prayer's provenance, Niebuhr wrote that the prayer "may have been spooking around for years, even centuries, but I don't think so. I honestly do believe that I wrote it myself." He confirmed this in 1967. His daughter, Elisabeth Sifton, thought that Niebuhr had first written it in 1943, while Niebuhr's wife Ursula believed it had been written in 1941 or '42, adding that it may have been used in prayers as early as 1934.

The Serenity Prayer was listed under Neibuhr in the Yale Book of Quotations (2006). Editor Fred R. Shapiro first raised doubts about Neibuhr's authorship in 2008, but after further research confirmed him in 2010.  William FitzGerald of Rutgers University-Camden argued in 2017 that credit should be given to Winnifred Wygal, a YWCA official and student of Neibuhr's at Union Theological Seminary. FitzGerald noted that "this is certainly not the first time a woman’s voice has been silenced by a man’s voice.".  Wygal is listed as author of the Serenity Prayer in The New Yale Book of Quotations (2021);  Shapiro includes a section "Anonymous Was a Woman" and the Serenity Prayer in the Introduction.

Mistaken dating

Though Niebuhr's daughter was once quoted suggesting that Niebuhr first wrote the prayer for the 1943 sermon at the Heath Evangelical Union Church, there is convincing documentary evidence that he had used it much earlier.

Precursors

Numerous statements of more or less similar sentiments by other authors have been identified and it is likely that more will be found. The prayer has also been falsely attributed to a variety of other authors.

Genuine precursors

Epictetus wrote: "Make the best use of what is in your power, and take the rest as it happens. Some things are up to us [eph' hêmin] and some things are not up to us. Our opinions are up to us, and our impulses, desires, aversions—in short, whatever is our own doing. Our bodies are not up to us, nor are our possessions, our reputations, or our public offices, or, that is, whatever is not our own doing."

The 8th-century Indian Buddhist scholar Shantideva of the ancient Nalanda University suggested:
If there's a remedy when trouble strikes,
What reason is there for dejection?
And if there is no help for it,
What use is there in being glum?

The 11th-century Jewish philosopher Solomon ibn Gabirol wrote:
And they said: At the head of all understanding – is distinguishing between what is and what cannot be, and the consoling of what is not in our power to change.

The philosopher W.W. Bartley juxtaposes without comment Niebuhr's prayer with a Mother Goose rhyme (1695) expressing a similar sentiment:
For every ailment under the sun
There is a remedy, or there is none;
If there be one, try to find it;
If there be none, never mind it.

Friedrich Schiller advocated the first part in 1801: "Blessed is he, who has learned to bear what he cannot change, and to give up with dignity, what he cannot save."

Spurious attributions

The prayer has been variously attributed (without evidence) to Thomas Aquinas, Cicero, Augustine, Boethius, Marcus Aurelius, and Francis of Assisi, among others.

Theodor Wilhelm, a professor of education at the University of Kiel, published a German version of the prayer under the pseudonym "Friedrich Oetinger". Wilhelm's version of the prayer became popular in West Germany, where it was widely but falsely attributed to the 18th-century philosopher Friedrich Christoph Oetinger. Scholar Elisabeth Sifton describes Wilhelm's account of the history of the prayer as "dishonest".

Use by twelve-step recovery programs

The prayer became more widely known after being brought to the attention of Alcoholics Anonymous in 1941 by an early member, who came upon it in a caption in a "routine New York Herald Tribune obituary".  The original clipping appeared in the May 28, 1941 public notices section:  "Mother--God grant me the serenity to accept things I cannot change, courage to change things I can, and wisdom to know the difference.  Goodby."   AA's co-founder Bill W. and the staff liked the prayer and had it printed in modified form and handed around. It has been part of Alcoholics Anonymous ever since, and has also been used in other twelve-step programs. "Never had we seen so much A.A. in so few words," noted Bill W. In its January 1950 edition, Grapevine, The International Journal of Alcoholics Anonymous, identified Niebuhr as the author (pp. 6–7), as does the AA web site.

Adaptations by other authors

In Bill Watterson's comic strip Calvin and Hobbes, Calvin says:

Know what I pray for?  The strength to change what I can, the inability to accept what I can't, and the incapacity to tell the difference.In Kurt Vonnegut's Slaughterhouse-Five, the Serenity Prayer appears in Chapter 3: it is displayed in Billy Pilgrim's optometry office; and though it reassures Pilgrim's patients, the Serenity Prayer underscores the irony of Pilgrim's fatalism.

A 1978 newspaper cartoon turned the phrase on its head: "If I'm not home accepting what I can't change, I'm probably out changing what I can't accept"; and a variant has become a popular slogan: "I'm no longer accepting the things I cannot change. I'm changing the things I cannot accept". This form is often, but incorrectly, attributed to the American activist Angela Davis.

Neil Young cites the Prayer on the back cover of his 1981 album Re•ac•tor.

References

External links

 The Essential Reinhold Niebuhr: Selected Essays and Addresses, editor: Robert McAfee Brown 
  Elisabeth Sifton, The Serenity Prayer: Faith and Politics in Times of Peace and War, New York, Norton, 2003 .   Elizabeth Sifton was Reinhold Niebuhr's daughter.
The Serenity Prayer: Faith in Times of Peace and War, National Public Radio - Fresh Air interview with Elisabeth Sifton (20 mins) January 14, 2005
 Full documentation (in German) of false claims of authorship
 The origin of our Serenity Prayer, at Alcoholics Anonymous
 Nell Wing (1981).  Origin of the Serenity Prayer: A Historic Paper 12 pp from AA General Service Office Service Material F-129 Rev 7/30/09  Accessed 10/20/22.   (Secretary to Bill W., First AA Archivist, 1954-1983)
Serenity Prayer - Quote Investigator December 24, 2019

Alcoholics Anonymous
Prayer
Twelve-step programs
Works by Reinhold Niebuhr